Hussain Salahuddin (Dhivehi: ހުސެއިން ސަލާހުއްދީން; April 14, 1881 – September 20, 1948), was an influential Maldivian writer, poet, essayist and scholar.

Salahuddin was one of the most prolific writers of early modern Maldivian literature (Dhivehi:  Era of Crawling), and contributed to Maldivian literature during a time when tremendous growth and innovations took place in the Maldivian literary scene. He was the father of Ibrahim Shihab, statesman of the Maldives.He was famous for writing Maldivian literature.

Lifetime and career
Hussain Salahuddin was born on April 14, 1881. He signed his writings as Salahuddin Hussein bin Moosa al-Mahli (صلاح الدين حسين بن موسى المحلى), meaning "Salahuddin Hussain, son of Moosa from Malé". He obtained his education on the island of Meedhoo. His master was Al-Allam al-Shaikh al-Hafiz Ibrahim Thakurufaan (Aisaabeegedaru Dhon Beyyaa). He subsequently studied under al-Shaikh Muhamed Jamaluddin Naib Thutthu. He is recognized for his contributions to Maldivian literature, including the translation of various books written in Arabic, Urdu and Persian into Dhivehi.

He also served in various key positions in the Maldivian government. He became the Attorney General of the Maldives at the young age of 18. He also served as the Chief Justice of the Maldives for a long time. Among the other positions that he assumed were the posts of Secretary and Prime Minister for the Majlis.

He served as the founder and principal of Majeediyya School in Malé, the first institution of formal education in the Maldives. Majeediyya School was started on the front veranda of Bageechaage, Salahuddin's residence.

During his lifetime, Salahuddin served in the National Literary Committee established by the President of the Maldives, Mohamed Amin Didi.

Salahuddin published some of the most famous and influential books and poems in Dhivehi. Books that he wrote include: The Story of Dhon Beefaan; The Story of Thakurufaan the Great; Shaikh Zubair, an interpretation of the works of two great Maldivian poets; Nu'umaan and Mariyam; two anthologies of poetry titled Morning Star I and II; and his most famous work, The Biography of Prophet Muhammad, in which he translated and combined various Arabic books about Muhammad into Dhivehi.

Influence and legacy
An audiobook version of the Biography of Prophet Muhammad is broadcast every Ramadan on Maldivian radio. The Biography is said to be the quintessence of Maldivian writing, even though it was a translation from Arabic works on the subject.

The Story of Thakurufaan the Great is nationally considered to be the definitive account of the life and times of the national hero, Sultan Muhammad Thakurufaan al Auzam. The book was based on orally transmitted folktales and legends concerning the man's life. Although Salaahuddin had used his own literary style in its writing, he remained faithful to the original folktales, the result being one of the true Maldivian epics. Even so, the National Day in the Maldives is celebrated on Rabi' al-awwal the first, celebrating the liberation of the Maldives from the Portuguese invaders.

Death 
Hussain Salahuddin died on September 20, 1948. He was buried in Colombo, Sri Lanka.

Children 
Hussain Salaahuddin's children were all writers, poets and speakers who filled various high positions in the government.

Children of Dhon Didi:
 Hawwa Saeed
 Khadheeja Saeed

Children of Sanfa Manike:
 Aishath
 Mohamed Saeed

Children of Medhuganduvaru Thuththu Gomaa:
 Adnan Hussain
 Fathimath Saeed
 Ibrahim Shihab
Maryam Saeed

External links
National Institute for Linguistic and Historical Research
  Website dedicated to Salaahuddeen 

1881 births
1948 deaths
Maldivian writers
Dhivehi people
20th-century Maldivian writers